Cygnus OB2 #12 is an extremely luminous blue hypergiant with an absolute bolometric magnitude (all electromagnetic radiation) of −10.9, among the most luminous stars known in the galaxy. This makes the star nearly two million times more luminous than the Sun, although estimates were even higher when the star was first discovered. It is now known to be a binary, with the companion approximately a tenth as bright.

Cygnus OB2
The dust causes the star to be strongly reddened despite being an intrinsically hot and blue star, hence it has been extensively studied in the infra-red. Were it not for the dust extinction, the star would have a visual magnitude about 1.5, nearly as bright as Deneb (Alpha Cygni), but because of the dust the observed visual magnitude is 11.4 so that it requires binoculars or a small telescope to be seen.

There are several fainter stars around Cygnus OB2 #12, thought to comprise a small cluster.  Two stars are only resolved by speckle interferometry.  One is thought to be a main sequence B star in a 100–200 year orbit. It is 2.3 magnitudes fainter than the primary star and 0.063" away.  The other is 4.8 magnitudes fainter and about an arc-second distant.  No spectroscopic companion could be detected in the spectrum.  However, analysis of x-ray emission suggests that there may be a hot luminous companion in a close orbit, with their colliding winds creating the x-rays.

Distance
However, the result included a significant amount of noise suggesting that it may have been inaccurate. Earlier measures of the parallax were too imprecise to be meaningful.

Properties
Cygnus OB2 #12 is a candidate luminous blue variable (LBV). Its position in the HR diagram, luminosity, and spectrum all classify it as an LBV.  It shows brightness variations of a few tenths of a magnitude, but these do not seem to be associated with colour changes that would be expected from an LBV.  The spectral type has varied slightly since its discovery, but not to the extent that would be normal for an LBV.  If the lower Gaia DR2 distance were correct then the properties of Cygnus OB2 #12 would mean it would be expected to pulsate at low amplitude with a period of a few days.

References

External links
 Online Astronomy: The Brightest Stars
 Tim Thompson: OB2-12
 http://jumk.de/astronomie/big-stars/cygnus-ob2-12.shtml

Cygnus (constellation)
101365
Luminous blue variables
B-type hypergiants
J20324096+4114291
Suspected variables